A stutter, or stuttering is a speech disorder characterized by the spasmodic repetition of a sound. 

Stutter or stuttering may also refer to:

Music 
Stutter (album), a 1986 album by the band James
"Stutter", a 1989 song by James from One Man Clapping
"Stutter" (Elastica song), a 1993 song by Britpop group Elastica
"Stutter" (Joe song), a 2000 song by American R&B singer Joe
"Stutter" (Maroon 5 song), a 2010 song by Maroon 5 from Hands All Over
Stutter edit, a technique employed by musicians like BT
"Stutter Rap" (No Sleep Til Bedtime), a 1988 song by Morris Minor and the Majors
"Stuttering (Don't Say)", a 2001 song by Wild Orchid
"Stuttering" (Fefe Dobson song), a 2010 single from Joy

Other 
Stutter (display), unsmooth motion on displays
Stutterer (film), a 2015 short film
Stuttering equivalence, a relation in theoretical computer science
Stutter step in tennis
Stuttering Frog, Mixophyes balbus
"Stuttering John" Melendez (born 1965), media personality

See also
Balbus (disambiguation)
Stammer (disambiguation)